Ancient Tones is an album by Ricky Skaggs and Kentucky Thunder, released through Skaggs Family Records on January 26, 1999. In 2000, the album won the group the Grammy Award for Best Bluegrass Album.

Track listing 
 "Walls of Time" (Monroe, Rowan) – 4:18
 "Lonesome Night" (Stanley) – 3:32
 "How Mountain Girls Can Love" (Rakes, Stanley) – 2:00
 "Mighty Dark to Travel" (Monroe) – 2:35
 "Carolina Mountain Home" (Scarborough, Wright) – 2:08
 "Connemara" (Skaggs) – 3:11
 "Coal Minin' Man" (Mills) – 3:51
 "I Believed in You Darlin'" (Monroe) – 3:00
 "Pig in a Pen" (traditional) – 1:58
 "Give Us Rain" (Foster) – 3:54
 "Boston Boy" (traditional) – 2:30
 "Little Bessie" (traditional) – 8:23

Personnel 

 Tony Baker – Photography
 Tye Bellar – Engineer, Mixing
 Paul Brewster – Guitar (Rhythm), Tenor (Vocal)
 Don Cobb – Mastering
 John Cowan – Tenor (Vocal)
 Jerry Douglas – Guitar
 Stuart Duncan – Fiddle
 Mark Fain – Bass
 Bobby Hicks – Fiddle
 Mary Alice Hoepfinger – Harp
 Brent King – Engineer, Mixing

 Graham Lewis – Engineer, Assistant Engineer, Mixing
 Jim Mills – Banjo
 Denny Purcell – Mastering
 R. Rakes – Composer
 Al Schulman – Mixing
 Jim Sherraden – Artwork, Layout Design
 Ricky Skaggs – Guitar, Mandolin, Vocals, Producer, Bodhran
 Chris Stone – Assistant Engineer
 Bryan Sutton – Guitar
 Darrin Vincent – Vocals, Baritone (Vocal)
 King Williams – Engineer, Assistant Engineer, Mixing

Chart performance

References

External links 
 Ricky Skaggs' official site

1999 albums
Ricky Skaggs albums
Grammy Award for Best Bluegrass Album